Coolbie is a coastal locality in the Shire of Hinchinbrook, Queensland, Australia.

References 

Shire of Hinchinbrook
Coastline of Queensland
Localities in Queensland